The Evansville River Rats were a professional minor league baseball team based in Evansville, Indiana. They played from 1901 to 1902 in the Illinois–Indiana–Iowa League (the "Three-I" League) and from 1903 to 1910 and 1914 to 1915 in the Central League. They played home games at Bosse Field, which is currently the third oldest baseball stadium in regular use in the United States.

Championships
 1908 – Central League Champions
 1915 – Central League Champions

Defunct minor league baseball teams
Sports in Evansville, Indiana
Defunct baseball teams in Indiana
1901 establishments in Indiana
1915 disestablishments in Indiana
Baseball teams established in 1901
Baseball teams disestablished in 1915
Illinois-Indiana-Iowa League teams
Central League teams